The 2022 Liga 3 Central Sulawesi is the fifth edition of Liga 3 Central Sulawesi organized by Asprov PSSI Central Sulawesi.

Followed by 17 clubs. The winner of this competition will immediately advance to the national round.

Persipal Palu is the defending champion after winning it in the 2021 season.

Teams 
2022 Liga 3 Central Sulawesi was attended by 17 teams from regencies and cities in Central Sulawesi who registered with the Asprov PSSI Central Sulawesi.

Venues
This season's Liga 3 Central Sulawesi matches were held at 2 stadiums in 2 regencies.
Gelora Samsurizal Tombolotutu Stadium, Parigi Moutong Regency
Kilongan Stadium, Banggai Regency

Group stage

Group A

Group B

Knockout stage 
Wait for the completion of the group stage first.

References

Liga 3
Central Sulawesi